John Andrew Armes (born 10 September 1955) is an Anglican bishop. He is the current Bishop of Edinburgh in the Scottish Episcopal Church.

Education 
Armes was educated at Sidney Sussex College, Cambridge (BA, 1977, proceeding MA, 1981), before further studies at Salisbury Theological College (1977) and the University of Manchester (PhD, 1996).

Ordained ministry
Ordained to the Anglican ministry as a deacon in 1979, Armes became a priest in 1980. After a curacy at Walney Island (1979–82) he was chaplain for agriculture in the Diocese of Carlisle (1982–86). He joined the team ministry of Greystoke, Matterdale and Mungrisdale (1982–86), becoming vicar of Watermillock, (1982–86). Appointed vicar of Whitworth, Lancashire (1986–88), then team rector (1988–94), he also served as chaplain to the University of Manchester (1986–94). He became priest-in-charge of Goodshaw and Crawshawbooth (1994–98) and Area Dean of Rossendale (1994–98). His next appointments were as rector of St John's, Edinburgh (1998–2012), and Dean of Edinburgh (2010–12).

Elected a bishop on 11 February 2012, Armes was consecrated and installed at St Mary's Cathedral, Edinburgh, on 12 May 2012.

Personal life
Armes married Clare Hewby in 1983; they have four children. His interests include theatre, cinema, walking, reading novels, watching sport, travel and humour.

References

Sources

 

1955 births
Living people
People from Hammersmith
Alumni of Sidney Sussex College, Cambridge
Alumni of Salisbury Theological College
Alumni of the University of Manchester
Deans of Edinburgh
Bishops of Edinburgh